Dr. Alec Kaplan (1890–1963) was a South African philatelist who was added to the Roll of Distinguished Philatelists in 1958.

References

Signatories to the Roll of Distinguished Philatelists
1890 births
1963 deaths
South African philatelists